Emrhys Cooper (Born 14 February 1985) is a British actor, singer, dancer, and filmmaker, currently, the male lead role in the Emmy nominated StyleHaul Drama Series Vanity (2015) in which he stars alongside Denise Richards and Karrueche Tran.

He has appeared in films such as Mamma Mia (2008), Stephen Fry's period drama Bright Young Things (2003), the romantic comedy Walk a Mile in My Pradas (2011), the award-winning indie drama Till We Meet Again (2016) and the Sci-fi drama Altered Perception (2016).

He could be seen in the television series Relationship Status.

Early life, family, and education 
Cooper was born in Devon, England. His father, Christopher, is a teacher and founder of the UK's South Devon Rudolf Steiner School. His mother, Raphaela, is an artist and former dancer.

He has an older sister called Fleur who runs a successful Travel and Lifestyle company and starred in the ITV series Million Dollar Babes.

Growing up, Cooper spent his free time training in dance, singing and acting.  He started working professionally at the age of 12. He appeared in several UK TV shows and commercials.

He earned a scholarship to The Central School of Ballet, where he studied from the ages of 16–18. He then changed course and attended the prestigious Laine Theatre Arts School to pursue a career in musical theatre.

He graduated with honours at the age of 19.

Career

2005–2014 
Cooper made his professional stage debut in the national tour of Fame – the Musical before making his West End debut at 21 in the Queen musical We Will Rock You.

In addition to appearing in West End musicals, Cooper also worked as a dancer with many of the world's biggest recording artists including Madonna, Christina Aguilera, Pussycat Dolls and the Sugababes, (in the video for "Push the Button") as the Geeky Guy directed by Matthew Rolston. Whilst dancing, Cooper appeared on TV shows such as X Factor, Americas Got Talent, Stars in Their Eyes and the MTV European Music Awards.

Cooper has made several appearances on British television, such as a recurring role on the soap opera Coronation Street, I'd Do Anything and 999 Lifesavers. His on-screen debut was in the 2003 film, Bright Young Things. He also featured in Mamma Mia! in 2008.

In 2008, he moved to Los Angeles where he quickly started working on many of the US's biggest shows including Desperate Housewives, CSI:NY, Touch and Blackish. His biggest role on prime time network TV came when he was cast on the hit TV series Person of Interest playing MI6 spy Young Greer. The elder John Greer is portrayed by the British actor John Nolan (cousin of Christopher Nolan).

Cooper has also had a string of independent movies such as Walk a Mile in My Pradas, I Want to get Married, Bloodrush, Altered Perception, and Till We Meet Again.

In 2013, Cooper was cast as the lead role in the Bhutanese feature film Kushuthara – Pattern of Love, filmed in the Kingdom of Bhutan. Cooper is the first ever Western actor to star in a Bhutanese film. 'Kushuthara' went on to garner wins at international film festivals and Cooper was awarded outstanding performance from a leading actor in the IndieFest film festival.

Notable US stage work includes the Dream It Productions critically acclaimed production of Entertaining Mr Sloan. Cooper won several awards for his portrayal of "Sloan" including being voted "Person to Watch" by Broadway World.

2015–present 
Cooper landed the lead role in the remake of the classic silent horror film Nosferatu, playing the lead role of Thomas Hutter.

This marks Cooper's biggest film role to date. The film also stars Doug Jones in the iconic role of Count Orlok. Other cast includes Joely Fisher and Sarah Carter.

Music 
In 2013, Cooper co-wrote and released his debut single "Hypnotized" through Inspire U records. The song played on many of the UK's major stations. The song can be heard in the feature film Kushuthara: Pattern of Love.

In 2016 he released the single "Reboot My Heart", which he co wrote with his songwriting partner Elaine Macaulso. Cooper also directed the music video shot in Bangkok and Ko Tao – Thailand.

Humanitarian work 
In February 2016, whilst shooting The Temple in Bhutan, Cooper visited the Neyphug (Heyphug) Monastery & School for orphaned and underprivileged boys. The site had been severely hit by an earthquake.
Neyphug is a charitable organisation that supports a monk community with a 450-year Buddhist history in the Kingdom of Bhutan.

Cooper also created a public service announcement after losing his song writing partner, Elaine Macaluso, to urethral cancer. He supports Urology Care Foundation, hoping to build awareness and urge people to get regular health check ups.

Cooper is also passionate about protecting wildlife and creating a healthy planet with WWF and Greenpeace. Cooper shares his home with 3 rescued cats and an African grey parrot.

Filmography

References

External links
 
 

Living people
21st-century English male actors
English male dancers
1985 births
English male musical theatre actors
English male film actors
English male television actors
People from Totnes
Male actors from Devon